Qualters is an American surname. Notable people with this surname include:

 Robert Qualters (born 1934), American painter, installation artist, and printmaker
 Tom Qualters (born 1935), American baseball player
 Tot Qualters (1894–1974), American actress, dancer, and singer

See also
 Qualter